Pavo is a Croatian masculine given name, cognate to Paul.

It may refer to:

 Pavo Barišić (born 1959), Croatian philosopher and politician
 Pavo Crnac (born 1971), Croatian football player
 Pavo Dadić (born 1969), Bosnian Croat football player
 Pavo Grgic, German parathlete
 Pavo Marković (born 1985), Croatian water polo player
 Pavo Raudsepp (born 1973), Estonian cross-country skier
 Pavo Urban (1968–1991), Croatian photographer

See also
 Paavo
 Pavao (given name)
 Pavel
 Pavle
 Pajo (given name)

Croatian masculine given names